The 2011–12 season was the 115th season of competitive football by Heart of Midlothian, and their 29th consecutive season in the top level of Scottish football, competing in the Scottish Premier League. Hearts also competed in the Europa League, Scottish Cup & the Scottish League Cup.

Summary

Season
Hearts finished fifth in the Scottish Premier League. They reached the Play Off Round of the Europa League, the third round of the League Cup and won the Scottish Cup after a 5–1 victory over Edinburgh Derby rivals Hibernian.

Management
Hearts started the season under the stewardship of Jim Jefferies but after only three games on 1 August 2011, he was removed from his post as manager by owner Vladimir Romanov. Jefferies was offered a new role at Hearts of Director of football which he turned down next day, marking his departure along with coach Billy Brown for the second time. Paulo Sergio was appointed as the new manager the same day.

Financial problems
The club began experiencing severe financial problems in November 2011 which meant they were unable to pay the players wages and the club was put up for sale. The squad's October salaries were late and the November wages were paid twenty nine days late just one day before their December salaries were due. The December pay has failed to arrive, and a complaint was lodged with the Scottish Premier League by the players union. During this period the club advised fringe players they were free to leave the club. On 4 January 2012 the SPL ordered Hearts to pay all outstanding wages by 11 January 2012 and January's wages must be paid on time on 16 January. Hearts paid all outstanding wages that day following the sale of Eggert Jónsson to Wolves. On 17 January the day after Hearts wages were due to be paid it was revealed all players had been paid. Despite this the SPL issued a statement saying Hearts had failed to pay all players on 16 January and an emergency board meeting had been called, Hearts refuted this saying payment of the remuneration had been made to all players. Hearts were charged by the SPL with failing to behave with the utmost good faith to the SPL. A hearing of the SPL Board sub-committee was held on 27 January, and the case against the club was dismissed as they believed the club were acting in good faith.

On 3 May, Hearts released their financial figures. Showing that they had made a profit of £511,000 and debt had been reduced from £36.1m to £24m. Hearts said that this had come down due to a debt restructuring plan. They also reduced operating costs by 19% to £3.63m and employment costs by 12% to £8.03m. Turnover at the club fell by £1m to £6.9m, this was mainly due to an outsourcing of retail merchandise as well as a lack of significant player sales or European competition.

Pre-season 

Hearts returned for pre-season training on 22 June, before travelling to Il Ciocco in Tuscany for a week at their pre-season camp. Hearts returned to Scotland to play East Fife before travelling to Berlin to take on Ludwigsfelder and Union Berlin. Once back in Scotland they completed their pre-season taking on Cowdenbeath and Livingston before a glamour friendly at Tynecastle against Royal Antwerp, to contest for the Tynecastle 125th anniversary trophy.

Fixtures

Scottish Premier League 

The fixture list for the first 33 SPL matches in the 2011–12 season was announced on 17 June. Hearts were given a tough away game to start the season against Rangers.

Fixtures

League table

UEFA Europa League 

Hearts entered the Europa League during the third qualifying round having qualified after finishing third in the SPL During season 2010–11. Hearts would have entered at the 2nd qualification round but thanks to Celtic winning the Scottish cup and gaining a higher qualification place their place went to Hearts. Hearts have been seeded for the third qualifying round. Hearts drew Paksi and travelled to Hungary, playing out a 1–1 draw. In the second leg goals from Ryan Stevenson, Andy Driver and Rudi Skácel were enough to win the tie 4–1 and progress to the play-off round with a 5–2 aggregate. Unseeded for the Play Off round Hearts drew English Premier League side Tottenham Hotspur in a game dubbed by the press as a Battle of Britain fixture. In the home leg at Tynecastle, Hearts were outclassed by Spurs who won the first leg 0–5. Hearts were much improved in the second leg but weren't able to claw back the tie earning a 0 – 0 draw, making them only first team since Real Madrid to leave White Hart Lane with a clean sheet. Hearts were eliminated on aggregate.

Fixtures

Scottish Cup

Hearts enter the Scottish Cup at the fourth round stage. The draw was conducted on 22 November and drew Hearts against Junior side Auchinleck Talbot. Hearts won 1–0 through a Gordon Smith goal after Fraser Mullen had a first half penalty saved. The fifth round draw took place on 9 January drawing Hearts with fellow premier league side St Johnstone, a reply of the fourth round the previous year. Hearts were held to a 1–1 draw. David Templeton scored early in the first half before St Johnstone equalised through Cillian Sheridan in the 78th minute forcing a replay. The draw was held for the quarter finals on 6 February 2012 drawing Hearts against either Ross County or St Mirren should they beat St Johnstone in the replay. Hearts won the replay 2–1 in extra time.
Murray Davidson scored for St Johnstone in the 83rd minute before Suso Santana was brought down in the box during the last minute of injury time. Jamie Hamill scored the resulting penalty to take the match to extra time, before captain Marius Žaliūkas scored in the 117th minute to win the match. St Mirren beat Ross county in their replay setting up another all Scottish Premier League tie in the quarter-finals.

Hearts were held to a 2–2 draw in the quarter-final tie with St Mirren forcing a replay. St Mirren went ahead through a Graham Carey free kick before Craig Beattie equalised. Hearts should have gone in at half time with a 2–1 lead but a further strike by Beattie was wrongly ruled off side by linesman Gary Cheyne. Rudi Skacel put Hearts in front before a Marius Žaliūkas own goal in the 84th minute levelled the tie. The draw was held for the semi finals on 11 March 2012, drawing the winner of the replay against Celtic. In the replay Nigel Hasselbaink had the ball in the net for St Mirren in the 12-minute, however the referee had blown for a penalty for St Mirren a split second before. The resulting Graham Carey penalty was saved by Jamie MacDonald. Hearts went on win the tie 2–0, through goals from Jamie Hamill and Rudi Skacel. The victory put Hearts through to the semi finals for the first time in 5 years.

Hearts won the semi final 2–1. After a goalless first half the introduction of Craig Beattie at half time made Hearts more of an attacking threat. After just 70 seconds he set up Rudi Skacel to score the match's opener. Gary Hooper equalised on the 87th minute, television replays later showed that Hooper was half-a-yard offside. With the match in injury time, referee Euan Norris awarded Hearts a penalty for a handball in the Celtic box by Joe Ledley. Beattie stepped up to score the Penalty, before getting booked for taking his shirt off and his impromptu lap of honour in his celebration of the goal. Celtic had an appeal for handball turned down in the dying minutes of the game and Hearts progressed to the final.

Hibernian beat Aberdeen in their semi final, to set up the final Edinburgh Derby of the season. This is the first time the two Edinburgh clubs have met in the Scottish Cup Final since 1896.

Fixtures

League Cup

Having qualified for the 2011–12 UEFA Europa League the previous season, Hearts entered the Scottish League Cup at the third round stage. The third round draw was held on 29 August where Hearts were paired with Scottish First Division side Ayr United. Hearts lost to Ayr United on penalties after a 1 – 1 draw after extra time. After the match Hearts asked the SFA to clarify the decision by referee Iain Brines after appearing to give the goal on three separate occasions. to disallow an Eggert Jonsson goal for handball

Fixtures

Players

Captains

Squad information
This section includes all players who have been part of the first team during the season. They may not have made an appearance.
Last updated 20 May 2012

Appearances (starts and substitute appearances) and goals include those in The SPL, Scottish Cup, League Cup and the UEFA Europa League.
1Player first came to the club on loan and was transferred the following year.
Squad only includes players currently registered with the club and those with professional contracts only.

Disciplinary record 
Includes all competitive matches.
Last updated 20 May 2012

Source: BBC Sport

Top scorers  
Last updated on 20 May 2012

Transfers

Hearts first transfer activity over the summer came on 25 May with the announcement that Jamie Hamill, John Sutton and Danny Grainger had all signed three-year contracts. The following day they announced the departure of three first team players, Jamie Mole, Dawid Kucharski and Paul Mulrooney. Along with six youth players who were not offered new contracts. Mehdi Taouil became Hearts fourth signing of the new season with Jonathan Brown, Rubén Palazuelos and Ismael Bouzid also leaving on freedom of contract. After featuring during pre-season and with only two days remaining before the season started Hearts accepted a bid of £1.5 Million for Lee Wallace from Rangers. Hearts had refused previous bids from Rangers for the player. That completed the transfer activity under Jim Jefferies. New manager Sergio made one transfer deal before the close of the summer transfer window with Callum Tapping joining Hearts from Tottenham.

Players in

Players out

Loans In

Loans Out

Club

Coaching staff

 (Until 1 August 2011)
 (Until 1 August 2011)

Playing kit
Hearts continue with Umbro as their kit manufacture for the 5th consecutive season, with Wonga.com replacing Ukio Bankas as sponsor having signed a two-year deal with Hearts.

See also
List of Heart of Midlothian F.C. seasons

References

External links
 BBC Sport Hearts
Edinburgh Evening News – Heart of Midlothian FC

Heart of Midlothian F.C. seasons
Heart of Midlothian
Heart of Midlothian